Matthew of Alexandria may refer to:

 Various men who have held the title and name of Pope Matthew of Alexandria
 Patriarch Matthew of Alexandria, Greek Patriarch of Alexandria in 1746–1766